Fränkisch-Crumbach is a municipality in the Odenwaldkreis (district) in Hesse, Germany.

Geography

Location
Fränkisch-Crumbach lies in the middle Odenwald on the Gersprenz, which empties into the Main near Stockstadt am Main.

Neighbouring communities
Fränkisch-Crumbach borders in the northeast on the community of Brensbach, in the southeast on the community of Reichelsheim (both in the Odenwaldkreis), in the west on the town of Lindenfels (Kreis Bergstraße), in the northwest on the community of Fischbachtal and in the north on the town of Groß-Bieberau (both in Darmstadt-Dieburg).

Politics

The municipal election held on 26 March 2006 yielded the following results:

Mayor
Mayor Eric Engels (CDU) was re-elected on 12 March 2017.

Culture and sightseeing

Buildings
The Evangelical Church of Saint Lawrence (Kirche St. Laurentius) is built in the Romanesque style. It was given a steeple and a quire with rib vaulting in 1485. Worthy of note are the epitaphs, some of which come from the Renaissance.
The Rodenstein Castle ruins, built about 1250
The tomb of the Barons of Gemmingen on the main street
The Schnellerts Castle ruins a few kilometres away.

Economy and infrastructure

Transport
The community is linked to the long-distance road network by Bundesstraße 38 (Weinheim–Roßdorf).

References

External links
 

Odenwaldkreis